Rajanya Shah (born February 16, 1974) is an American rower who competed in the 1997, 1998, and 1999 World Rowing Championships, as well as the 2000 Summer Olympics in Sydney, Australia.

Shah was born on February 16, 1974, in Albany, New York. She attended Phillips Exeter Academy, and then Brown University, where she coxed an eight-member team.

References 

American female rowers
Coxswains (rowing)
Brown University alumni
Phillips Exeter Academy alumni
1974 births
Living people
Olympic rowers of the United States
Rowers at the 2000 Summer Olympics
21st-century American women